Acherontiini is a tribe of moths of the family Sphingidae.

Taxonomy 
Genus Acherontia
Genus Agrius
Genus Callosphingia
Genus Coelonia
Genus Megacorma

 
Sphinginae
Taxa named by Jean Baptiste Boisduval